Pseudogynoxys cummingii is a species of the genus Pseudogynoxys and family Asteraceae. It is one of three species of Pseudogynoxys that are known in cultivation.

References

cummingii